PBF Energy Inc. is a petroleum refiner and supplier (Downstream operator) of unbranded transportation fuels, heating oils, lubricants, petrochemical feedstocks, and other petroleum products. Headquartered in Parsippany, New Jersey, the company's refineries include facilities in Chalmette, Louisiana; Toledo, Ohio; Port of Paulsboro in Gibbstown, New Jersey; the Delaware City Refinery in Delaware City; the former ExxonMobil refinery in Torrance, California; and the former Shell refinery in Martinez, California. PBF produces a range of products including gasoline, ultra-low-sulfur diesel (ULSD), heating oil, jet fuel, lubricants, petrochemicals and asphalt.

In February 2020, with the acquisition of the Martinez Refinery, PBF Energy currently owns and operates six domestic oil refineries and related assets with a combined processing capacity, known as throughput, of approximately 1,000,000 bpd, and a weighted average Nelson Complexity Index of 13.2.

History and acquisitions 
PBF was formed in 2008 as a joint venture by Petroplus Holdings and the private equity companies Blackstone Group and First Reserve, each committing $667 million in equity. In September 2010 Petroplus announced plans to sell its 32.62 percent stake to its partners for $91 million as PBF acquired the Paulsboro refinery from Valero Energy. PBF then acquired the Toledo refinery from Sunoco in December 2010 for approximately $400 million. PBF went public in December 2012 with a $533 million initial public offering.

In 2015 PBF acquired the 189,000 BPD Chalmette, Louisiana refinery from ExxonMobil and its partner, the state-owned Petroleos de Venezuela, for $322 million, in a deal that included interests in chemical facilities, pipelines and other assets at the site located just ten minutes from downtown New Orleans.

In July 2016, PBF acquired the 155,000 BPD ExxonMobil refinery in Torrance, California for $537.5M. The acquisition included ownership interests in several crude gathering and transportation pipelines, product pipelines, products terminals and crude and products storage facilities, and increased PBF's total throughput capacity to approximately 900,000 barrels per day, making it the fourth largest independent refiner in North America.

PBF's refineries in Paulsboro (NJ) and Delaware City (DE) have been cited by environmentalists for processing crude oil from the Amazon River Basin in South America. In 2015, the Delaware City and Paulsboro refineries were processing more than 3,300 and 2,666 barrels per day of crude originating in the Amazon, respectively. The company had 3,165 employees as of 2017 with annual revenue of $21,787 million.

In June 2019, PBF agreed to purchase Shell's Martinez, California oil refinery. The sale was finalized Feb. 1, 2020.

References

External links 

Oil companies of the United States
Companies based in Morris County, New Jersey
Energy in New Jersey
2012 initial public offerings
Companies listed on the New York Stock Exchange